The Chrysler Imperial, introduced in 1926, was Chrysler's top-of-the-line vehicle for much of its history. Models were produced with the Chrysler name until 1954, after which it became a standalone brand; and again from 1990 to 1993. The company positioned the cars as a prestige marque to rival Cadillac, Continental, Lincoln, Duesenberg, Pierce Arrow, Cord, and Packard. According to Antique Automobile, "The adjective ‘imperial’ according to Webster's Dictionary means sovereign, supreme, superior or of unusual size or excellence. The word imperial thus justly befits Chrysler's highest priced model."

For several decades and multiple generations, the Imperial was the exclusive Chrysler and the favorite choice of luxurious transportation for senior executive leadership, government officials, royalty and various celebrities in comparison to the more affordable Chrysler New Yorker. Over the years the appearance, technological advancements and luxurious accommodations updated with the latest trends and fashionable appearances. Limousines, town cars and convertibles were the usual appearances, while special coachwork choices were provided by the industry’s best providers, to include Derham, Fleetwood, LeBaron, and others.

The Chrysler Imperial rose was cultivated in 1952 and used to promote the brand.

1926–1930

In 1926, Walter P. Chrysler decided to compete with North American marques Cadillac, Lincoln, Packard, Pierce Arrow, Studebaker, Cord, and Duesenberg in the luxury car field, while the newly formed company only had a large displacement straight-six to offer. The new model, called Imperial, had a new engine that was slightly larger than the company's standard straight 6 installed in the Chrysler Six. Large displacement engines provided the horsepower and torque clients wanted and due to the low quality of gasoline fuel at the time, and low compression ratios, 50 bhp was more than adequate. It is estimated that the rating equivalent of early gasoline available varied from 40 to 60 octane and that the "High-Test", sometimes referred to as "fighting grade", probably averaged 50 to 65 octane. The front axle was solid and the suspension consisted of semi-elliptic leaf springs while the rear suspension was a differential axle, and also using semi-elliptic leaf springs. The use of the "imperial" name being exclusively used on Chrysler's flagship had been previously used by Buick, Cadillac and Packard for top level limousines. The hood ornament/radiator cap was a stylized Viking Winged helmet.

The car was chosen as the pace car for the 1926 Indianapolis 500. The model was designated E-80, the 80 being after the "guaranteed"  all-day cruising speed. Four-speed manual transmission was added in 1930. The attention to luxury and multiple bodystyles was a similar approach to one Mr. Chrysler used as president of the Buick Motor Company, his employer from 1911 to 1919. Chrysler offered a variety of body styles: a two/four-passenger roadster (four passenger if car had the rumble seat), a four-seat coupé, five-passenger sedan and phaeton, and a seven-passenger top-of-the-line limousine. The limo had a glass partition between the front and rear passenger compartments.

Imperials could be distinguished from Chrysler products by the use of a distinctive scalloped hood and radiator shell and a  wheelbase, which shared an appearance with Packard and the Buick Master Six. The Berline Limousine was listed at US$3,595 ($ in  dollars ).

Five two-door coachwork choices included roadsters and convertible, while there were nine sedan, town car, phaeton and limousine choices. The top level Town Car was listed at US$5,495 ($ in  dollars ). Standard equipment on roadster and phaeton open-body coachwork selections included wind wings and leather exterior door trim panels, while many cars were painted in contrasting two-tone paint. The convertible was equipped with functioning landau irons.

1928 offered a  wheelbase with the designation Series 80L. Coachwork choices expanded with five provided by Briggs, and six choices from LeBaron, one Derham Convertible Sedan, one Phaeton from Locke, and four Dietrich convertible coupes and sedans, listing the Dietrich Convertible Sedan at US$6,795 ($ in  dollars ). Total Chrysler calendar year production was recorded at 160,670, their all-time high pre-war until decades later

Model years 1929 and 1930 Series 80L were essentially unchanged from the 1928 version as engineering efforts were focusing on the 1931 Series CG Straight Eight, while there were some engineering advancements, to include thermostatically controlled automatic adjusting exterior radiator shutters, vertical hood louvers and a four-speed manual transmission. Coachbuilder Locke provided four convertible choices in both coupe and sedan configurations, and hydraulic four wheel brakes were now standard on all Chrysler products. The top level 1930 Series 80L Limousine was listed at US$3,575 ($ in  dollars ).

1931–1933

The all-new 1931 "Chrysler Imperial 8" introduced the new in-line 8-cylinder engine which was shared with the Chrysler Eight Series CP in smaller displacements. The car received a new  Chrysler flathead Straight-8 with a Stromberg Model DD-3 carburetor. The Imperial introduced a vee-type radiator, a long straight hood that displayed "torpedo" styling, and wide flowing fenders with a split and slanted windshield and showed visual similarities to the Cord L-29. Various features considered luxurious in nature at the time included dual sun visors, adjustable front seats and steering column, rust-proof fenders, wire-spoked wheels, automatic heater control, safety glass and Lockheed supplied hydraulic brakes.  To minimize engine vibration from being felt by passengers, an isolation feature called "Floating Power" was introduced.

The Imperial Series CG offered four sedan coachwork choices from Briggs, while LeBaron offered four convertible coupe and sedan choices. At least ten Individual Custom 2-door coupes were documented from individual coachwork providers Waterhouse, Drauz and LeBaron. These were custom built to specification, and were variously equipped with anything the customer desired—even a Dictaphone. Prices ranged from US$2,745 ($ in  dollars ) for the factory supplied four-door, five-passenger Sedan to US$3,575 ($ in  dollars ) for the LeBaron Dual Cowl Phaeton. Stock car driver Harry Hartz set numerous speed records with a 1933 Imperial sedan at Daytona Beach, Florida. A roadster was entered in the 1931 24 Hours of Le Mans competition but did not finish due to radiator failure. It was introduced shortly after the Rolls-Royce Phantom II, Mercedes-Benz 770, Packard Eight, Duesenberg Model J, Renault Reinastella, Cadillac Series 355, and Lincoln K-series. Total documented CG production shows that 3,228 of all body style choices were manufactured, including chassis only supplied to individual coachwork providers. A stylized gazelle statuette was added to the Viking Winged helmet radiator cap and hood ornament for all Imperial vehicles starting in 1931.

Model year 1932 introduced the junior Series CH Imperial while the previous Series CG became the Series CL and took the name Imperial Custom to continue to provide individually requested, customized vehicles. The Series CH was related to the Chrysler Series CP in that the straight-eight engine, and most features were shared while the Imperial Series CH was offered with many standard features that were optional on the Series CP. The Series CH and CL featured all steel body work, a double drop "girder truss" chassis frame, split windshields, dual sun visors, and trumpet horns. The ignition was provided by Delco-Remy, the brakes were hydraulic and the transmission was a four-speed manual transmission with an optional automatic vacuum operated clutch. The body styles offered on the Series CH were a two-door, two-passenger roadster convertible with available rumble seat, a four-door sedan or a four-door convertible. The roadster listed price was US$1,925 ($ in  dollars ) while the four-door convertible was US$2,195 ($ in  dollars ) which made the more esteemed "Imperial" brand almost identically priced to "Chrysler" branded products, while the engine displacement on the Series CH was larger. The 1932 Series CL remained the more prestigious Imperial and all coachwork was provided by LeBaron offering four convertible body styles along with a conventional seven-passenger sedan or eight-passenger limousine, while documented records show one two-passenger Roadster and one Landau Limousine were manufactured. Records show that 32 Series CL Sedan Limousine by LeBaron were sold for US$3,295 ($ in  dollars ).

The Series CQ Imperial was all-new for 1933 from the previous Series CH and the wheelbase lost  and the  Chrysler I8 had reduced displacement. Three two-door, two-passenger coupes to include a Victoria and Roadster Convertible, and two four-door, five-passenger choices with one sedan convertible were offered by Briggs. Mechanical improvements offered were a silent, helical gear three-speed transmission, an improved oil filter and an automatic choke for the Stromberg IV Model EX-32 carburetor. Only three sedan coachwork choices were offered for the Series CL sedan with the  wheelbase. Production records document 3,838 Series CQ and 151 Series CL were manufactured, including six Chassis and Cowl only requests.

1934–1936 

The Chrysler Imperial introduced in 1934 offered the 'Airflow' design, reflecting an interest in streamlining. The car was marketed with the slogan "The car of tomorrow is here today." The 1934 Series CV featured eight-passenger seating and again an eight-cylinder engine while it was the Chrysler Airflow Series CV with Imperial luxury appearance and additional optional features as standard equipment, including vacuum assisted power brakes and a Stromberg two barrel carburetor Model EE-22. It was the first car to be designed in a wind tunnel. Initial tests indicated that the standard car of the 1920s worked best in the wind-tunnel when pointed backwards with the curved rear deck facing forward. It led to a rethinking of the fundamental design of Chrysler's cars with a primary focus on reducing wind noise inside the passenger compartment. Both engine and passenger compartment were moved forward, giving better balance and ride. An early form of unibody construction was employed, giving them a durability advantage in comparison to body on frame construction. It continued to offer a Chrysler engine vibration isolation feature called "Floating Power" and was one of the first automobiles to offer a one piece curved windshield. Chrysler offered both the conventional Airstream models along with the Airflow models under the "Chrysler" marque but only offered the "Imperial" marque with Airflow models.

The 1934 Imperial Airflow Series CV offered the  Chrysler flathead straight eight with an aluminum cylinder head and overdrive manual transmission, and body style choices were a two-door coupe, four-door sedan and four-door Town Sedan on a  wheelbase, and were priced at US$1,625 ($ in  dollars ). The longer wheelbase Imperial Custom Airflow Series CX offered only sedan choices, to include Town Sedan and Limousine choices on a  wheelbase for US$2,345 ($ in  dollars ). The top level Imperial Custom Airflow Series CW offered a four-door Sedan, Limousine or Town Limousine for US$5,000 ($ in  dollars ) using a  wheelbase and the  Straight Eight. Documented production numbers for 1934 show 2,277 Series CV, 106 Series CX and 67 Series CW were produced. Its prestige was similar to the Cadillac Series 90 limousine, Rolls-Royce Phantom III, Packard Twelve, Mercedes-Benz 770, Renault Suprastella and the Lincoln Custom.

The public was put off by the unconventional styling and the "Airstream" appearance on Chryslers outsold the "Airflow" by 3 to 1. The 1935 Imperial Airflow Series C-2 and Series C-3 were carryover from resources not used for 1934 due to underwhelming sales after the appearance was panned in favor of competitors, while the conventionally styled Chrysler Airstream was better received that replaced the Chrysler Series CA and Series CB. Total production documented records show 2,598 Series C-2 coupes and sedans were manufactured, while just 125 Series C-3 rolled off the assembly line, accounting for both coupe and sedan production. The top level Series CW recorded only 32 limousines that could accommodate eight passengers, offering four different coachwork choices for a minimum listed price of US$5,000 ($ in  dollars ).

1936 was the last year for the "Airflow" appearance, while there were some enhancements and features added to entice buyers. A new grille, all-steel roof construction and a luggage compartment was added. The wheelbase was lengthened and the doors and side windows. The front windshield was either split or curved one piece on the Imperial Custom and continued to be extendable from the base outwards while a separate retractable cowl ventilator remained to provide fresh air inside the passenger compartment. Production numbers continued to fall to a total of 4,500 Series C-10 sedans and coupes and 75 Series C-11 sedans and limousines. A total of 10 Series CW were documented to be sold while the actual manufacture date were previous years that were registered, and dated as 1936 models. The pricing structure was simplified as US$1,475 ($ in  dollars ) for the Series C-10 for the coupe or sedan, and US$2,475 ($ in  dollars ) for the Series C-11 sedan or limousine. While 1936 was the most profitable season for Chrysler since 1929, the Airflow program was cancelled, and the Imperial Custom Airflows are recognized as Classics by the Classic Car Club of America.

1937–1939

Chrysler reverted back to body on frame construction and there were three models in this generation designated as Imperial. The polarizing appearance was modified with an return to "torpedo" styling, sharing the appearance of a long, straight hood and cowl and moving the headlights outwards into the front fenders with the more successful "Airstream" appearance. The Series C-14 offered the straight eight, shared with the Chrysler Royal C-16 . The Series C-15 was the Imperial Custom and the Town Sedan Limousine, with blind rear quarter panels and was available on request. The top level Imperial Custom Series CW continued to be offered but was very exclusive, using a  wheelbase while eliminating the "Airflow" nameplate. Innovations for 1937 included built-in defroster vents, safety-type interior hardware (such as flexible door handles and recessed controls on the dash), seat-back padding, and fully insulated engine mounts. Brakes were 13-inch drums, then in 1939 they expanded to 14 inches, but shrunk to 12-inch drums in 1940. Front suspension was independent. Unusually for ventilation, it had a concealed crank to extend the base of the split windshield outward and the top edge of the engine hood was hinged at the cowl and opened from the grille and up. Access to the engine was accommodated with side hood panels that were released by catches on the inside. An Imperial Custom Series C-15 Convertible Sedan by Derham was used as the AAA Official Car at the 1937 Indy 500 and was painted silver and black to celebrate the racetracks 25th anniversary.

According to 1937 documented records, 11,976 Series C-14 Touring Sedans were produced at a listed price of US$1,100 ($ in  dollars ). While the Imperial Custom Series CW was offered in its final year for 1937, documentation does not record that one was built, while three 1937 Series CW were recorded to have been updated with 1936 appearance features and LeBaron bodywork. The first one was built for the Hershey family who had an antique car collection at the time now called the AACA Museum in Hershey, Pennsylvania. The second Series CW was built for The President of the Philippines Manuel L. Quezon, the first president of the Spanish Commonwealth of the Philippines and is maintained by the government. The third car was built for radio personality Major Edward Bowes which later joined a car collection of Frank Kleptz of Terre Haute, Indiana. A Life magazine article written in 1940 quoted the value of Major Bowes car at US$25,000 ($ in  dollars ). According to records, after the death of Mr. Bowes the car returned to Chrysler in 1941. It was allegedly repainted black from the original Brewster Green and put into wartime service in 1942, used by Admiral Chester Nimitz as a staff car.

For 1938, The Series C-19 was shared with the Imperial and all-new New York Special which became the New Yorker in 1939. While the New York Special was offered as a Business Coupe, of which no records show one was ordered and built, and a four-door Touring Sedan, the Imperial Series C-19 was offered in six body choices and the chassis was available separately for additional coachwork selections. Three convertible choices, to include a two-door roadster with rumble seat and a four-door convertible were listed between US$1,123 ($ in  dollars ) and US$1,595 ($ in  dollars ). The Imperial Custom offered three factory coachwork choices and five custom choices provided by Derham to include two convertible and two Town Car Limousines. The Imperial Custom Series CW was no longer offered. According to documented records, 8,554 Series C-19 Touring Sedans were produced at a listed price of US$1,198 ($ in  dollars ).

For 1939, model names and series numbers were updated. The Series C-23 was shared with the Imperial, the New Yorker and the Saratoga. The straight eight was shared with all three and an aluminum cylinder head was optional on the high compression engine. Visual distinctions could be found in the interior fabrics, the number of chrome pieces in the grille and nameplate badges installed. A Victoria coachwork choice, provided by Hayes Body Company, was offered on the Imperial along with either a two-door Business Coupe or five-passenger Brougham Coupe and a four-door sedan. The top level Series C-24 offered three factory provided sedans, including a limousine, or three convertible body style choices from Derham. The car pictured is J.G. Martin's (retired airline mechanic) 1939 Series C-24 7-passenger Limousine Sedan, believed by him and his son Tim to be the only 1939 production 7-passenger limousine still on the road. The listed price was US$2,695 ($ in  dollars ). One of three Imperial Custom Convertible Town Car by Derham was specially built for the 1939 royal tour of Canada of British King George VI and Queen Elizabeth when their visit was in the United States. This car was then donated to the Detroit American Legion post.

Following an assassination attempt in 1937, an armoured Chrysler Imperial was purchased as the official car for António de Oliveira Salazar, the Prime Minister of Portugal.

1940–1948

In 1940 the Imperial Crown Series C-27 was the only vehicle to wear the "Imperial" nameplate and was offered in four body styles labeled as six-passenger Sedan, an eight-passenger Sedan, the eight-passenger Limousine, and the six-passenger Derham Parade Phaeton. The styling was shared with all Chrysler models for that year and offered front fender parking lights with conventional running boards, and distinguishing a Chrysler model was limited to a nameplate attached on the front fender just below the engine hood, interior upholstery and standard features installed that were optional on other models. The six-passenger sedan offered storage compartments in the front seatbacks and foot rests, while the eight-passenger sedan replaced the storage compartments with accommodation for storing the retractable jump seats and no foot rests. The limousine offered a retractable glass partition between the driver and passenger compartment, installing leather seating for the driver and wool upholstery for the passenger compartment, Lockheed hydraulic brakes, and two-speed electric windshield wipers were standard. The listed price for the limousine was US$2,695 ($ in  dollars ).

The 1941 Imperial Crown Series C-33 remained exclusive and special models were available. The Imperial Special Town Sedan used the shorter New Yorker chassis with an Imperial Crown nameplate with a listed price of US$1,675 ($ in  dollars ). Laidlaw interior fabrics, Goodyear Double Eagle Tires installed on "Safety Rim" pressed steel wheels, and hydroelectric power windows lifts were some of the items installed. The body work appearance was shared with Chrysler products for 1941 and 1942. The only Series C-33 Imperial Crown chassis, with Derham-supplied body work, was recorded to be used for a Imperial Custom landaulet limousine for Briggs Manufacturing Company President Walter O. Briggs.

The 1942 production year was brief and the New Yorker replaced most of the Imperial product line. The new designation Imperial Crown Series C-37 was the only product to wear the "Imperial" nameplate, while Derham continued to build custom limousines, town cars and four-door convertibles using the Series C-37 designation, listing the limousine at US$3,065 ($ in  dollars ). As with all U.S.-built automobiles, production was suspended February 1942 due to World War II production demands, and did not resume until the 1946 model year.

When Chrysler discontinued the Imperial model name, the "Imperial" name was introduced on top-level Cadillac Series 70 limousines, starting in 1941 until 1946 when the Imperial Crown limousine returned. The 1946 Imperial Crown continued the tradition of sharing a common appearance with all Chrysler branded vehicles and could be distinguished by the  wheelbase, wool broadcloth upholstery for rear passengers with leather upholstery for the drivers divider window separated front compartment and other standard luxury features. The Series C-40 production records show that only 165 were built at a price of US$3,875 ($ in  dollars ) with its competitors listed as the Cadillac Series 75 Fleetwood and the Packard Custom Super Clipper. 1947 saw increased production at 740 despite an increase in price to US$4,305 ($ in  dollars ) with no appearance or feature changes and 1948 saw a drop in production to 495 and a price of US$4,767 ($ in  dollars ).

1949–1954

The Imperial name returned for 1949 as a sedan while the Imperial Crown limousine continued as Chrysler was celebrating their 25th anniversary. The short-wheelbase Imperial was only available as a four-door six-passenger sedan. The 4-door 8-passenger Imperial Crown was available as a sedan, or as a limousine with a retractable division window. 1949 Imperials are very rare as production records show only 50 Imperial sedans and 85 Imperial Crown limousines were built. The retail price for the 1949 Imperial was US$4,664 ($ in  dollars ) and US$5,334 ($ in  dollars ) for the Imperial Crown limousine.

The new custom-built Imperial sedan was based on the Chrysler New Yorker. It shared the same trim, but had a canvas-covered roof and leather and broadcloth Imperial upholstery. These features were installed by Derham, on the all new postwar Chrysler sheetmetal. Early 1949 Imperial Crowns were leftover 1948s. The really new models didn't arrive until March 1949. Their styling was sleeker than previous models, yet conservative. Fewer, but heavier bars were used in the cross-hatched grille. The upper and center horizontal pieces wrapped around the front fenders. Rocker panel moldings, rear fender stone guards, full length lower-window trim, and horizontal chrome strips on the rear fenders, and from the headlights to about halfway across the front doors, were used to decorate the side body.

The 1950 Crosley Hot Shot is often given credit for the first production disc brakes but the Chrysler Imperial Crown  had them first as standard equipment at the beginning of the 1949 model year. The Crosley disc was a Goodyear development, a caliper type with ventilated rotor, originally designed for aircraft applications. Only the Hot Shot featured it. Lack of sufficient research caused enormous reliability problems, especially in regions requiring the use of salt on winter roads, such as sticking and corrosion. Drum brake conversion for Hot Shots was quite popular.

The Chrysler 4-wheel disc brake system was more complex and expensive than Crosley's, but far more efficient and reliable. It was built by Auto Specialties Manufacturing Company (Ausco) of St. Joseph, Michigan, under patents of inventor H.L. Lambert, and was first tested on a 1939 Plymouth. Unlike the caliper disc, the Ausco-Lambert utilized twin expanding discs that rubbed against the inner surface of a cast iron brake drum, which doubled as the brake housing. The discs spread apart to create friction against the inner drum surface through the action of standard wheel cylinders.

Chrysler discs were "self-energizing," in that some of the braking energy itself contributed to the braking effort. This was accomplished by small balls set into oval holes leading to the brake surface. When the disc made initial contact with the friction surface, the balls would be forced up the holes forcing the discs further apart and augmenting the braking energy. This made for lighter braking pressure than with calipers, avoided brake fade, promoted cooler running, and provided one-third more friction surface than standard Chrysler  drums. But because of the expense, the brakes were only standard on the Chrysler Imperial Crown through 1954 and the Town and Country Newport in 1950. They were optional, however, on other Chryslers, priced around $400, at a time when an entire Crosley Hot Shot retailed for $935. Today's owners consider the Ausco-Lambert very reliable and powerful, but admit its grabbiness and sensitivity.

The 1950 Imperial was essentially a New Yorker with a custom interior. It had a Cadillac-style grille treatment that included circular signal lights enclosed in a wraparound ribbed chrome piece. Side trim was similar to last year's model, but the front fender strip ended at the front doors and the rear fender molding was at the tire top level and integrated into the stone guard. Unlike the standard Imperial, the Imperial Crown had a side treatment in which the rear fender moldings and stone guard were separate. Body sill moldings were used on all Imperials, but were of a less massive type on the more massive Crown models. A special version of the limousine was available. It featured a unique leather interior and a leather top that blacked out the rear quarter-windows. Power windows were standard on the Imperial Crown .

In an unusual move for the 1950s, the 1951 Imperial had noticeably less chrome than the lower-priced New Yorker that was its base. It also had three horizontal grille bars with the parking lights between the bars and a chrome vertical center piece. Aside from its front fender nameplate, side body trim was limited to the moldings below the windows, rocker panel moldings, bright metal stone shields and a heavy horizontal molding strip running across the fender strips. Three 2-door bodystyles were added to the Imperial model in 1951: a Club coupe, a hardtop, and a convertible. Only 650 convertibles were sold and it would be discontinued the following year, with a listed price of US$4,402 ($ in  dollars ). 1951 was also the year that Chrysler introduced its  Hemihead V8. "Hydraguide" power steering, an industry first for use in production automobiles, became available on the Imperial for an additional $226 and it was standard on the Imperial Crown. 

1952 Imperials were practically identical to the 1951 models, and the most effective way to tell the difference between them is through reference to serial numbers. The convertible bodystyle was dropped in 1952. Unlike the case with Chryslers, the Imperial's taillights were not changed. Power steering was standard. The "new" Imperial Crown was also unchanged for 1952. Only 338 of these cars were made in the 1951–1952 model run, and serial numbers indicate that 205 were registered as 1952 automobiles. A minor change was a one-inch reduction in the front tread measurement.

In 1953 the Imperial model was renamed the Imperial Custom. Although the Imperial Custom resembled the New Yorker, it had a different wheelbase, taillights, and side trim. Clean front fenders and higher rear fender stone shield set it apart from the "ordinary" Chryslers. This was also the first year for the stylized eagle hood ornament. Power brakes, power windows, center folding armrests (front and rear) and a padded dash were standard. Parking lights on all Imperials were positioned between the top and center grille moldings, a variation from the design used on other Chrysler cars. A new model was the six-passenger Imperial Custom limousine which had as standard equipment electric windows, electric division window, floor level courtesy lamps, rear compartment heater, fold-up footrests, seatback mounted clock and special luxury cloth or leather interiors. On 10 March 1953, the exclusive Imperial Custom Newport hardtop was added to the Imperial line at $325 over the price of the eight-passenger sedan ($ in  dollars ). The 2-door Club coupe was discontinued. Imperial Custom sedans now rode on a wheelbase  longer than the 2-door hardtops. The eagle ornament was about the only thing new on the 1953 Imperial Crown. The nameplate was changed slightly and the limousine featured moldings on top of the rear fenders. Imperial Crowns came with a 12-volt electrical system (Imperial Customs still had a 6-volt system) and Chrysler's first fully automatic transmission, called PowerFlite, became available late in the model year, being installed in a limited number of cars for testing and evaluation. Power steering was standard on Imperial Crowns. Also, 1953 was the first year that the Imperial had a one-piece windshield, instead of a two-piece one. A padded dash was standard.

The 1953 Chrysler Imperial was the first production car in twelve years to have automotive air conditioning, following tentative experiments by Packard in 1940 and Cadillac in 1941. Walter P. Chrysler had seen to the invention of Airtemp air conditioning back in the 1930s for the Chrysler Building, and had ostensibly offered it on cars in 1941-42, and again in 1951-52, but none are known to have been sold in the latter form until the 1953 model year. In installing optional Airtemp air conditioning units to its Imperials in 1953, Chrysler beat Cadillac, Buick and Oldsmobile which added air conditioning as an option in the 1953 model year.

Airtemp was more sophisticated and efficient than the complicated rival air conditioners of 1953. It recirculated, rather than merely cooled, the air inside the vehicle, and it was also the highest capacity unit available on an automobile. It was also simple to operate, with a single switch on the dashboard marked with low, medium, and high positions, which the driver selected as desired. The system was capable of cooling a Chrysler from 120 degrees to 85 degrees in about two minutes, and of completely eliminating humidity, dust, pollen and tobacco smoke at the same time. Since it relied on fresh air, and drew in sixty percent more of it than any contemporary system, Airtemp avoided the staleness associated with automotive air conditioning at the time. It was silent and unobtrusive. Instead of plastic tubes mounted on the package shelf as on GM and on other cars, small ducts directed cool air toward the ceiling of the car where it filtered down around the passengers instead of blowing directly on them, a feature that modern cars have lost.

In 1954 the Imperial Custom had a new grille consisting of a heavy wraparound horizontal center bar with five ridges on top and integrated circular signal lights. Its front fender nameplate was above a chrome strip, which ran the length of the front door to the front of the door opening. The rear fender stone guard was larger than in 1953, but the rocker panel molding and rear fender chrome strip style were still the same. The back-up lights were now located directly below the taillights, rather than dividing the lights as in the previous year's model. The Imperial Crown shared basic styling with the Imperial Custom. However it had center-opening rear doors and Cadillac-like rear fender taillights. Air conditioning was standard on the Imperial Crown .

1955–1983: A separate brand

1955-1975
Chrysler Corporation advised state licensing bureaus that beginning in 1955, the Imperial was to be registered as a separate make. It was an attempt to compete directly with GM's Cadillac and Ford's Lincoln distinct luxury-focused marques. Frequently and erroneously referred to as the "Chrysler Imperial", these cars had no "Chrysler" badging anywhere on them until 1971 (although it was removed by 1974), and were a separate distinct marque, just as Lincoln and Cadillac were for Ford and GM. Starting with the 1974 Imperial models, the "Chrysler" badging was again removed from its car body, with only the "Imperial" nameplate appearing.

In April 1955 Chrysler and Philco announced the development and production of the world's first all-transistor car radio. The radio, Mopar model 914HR, was a $150.00 "option", or equal to $ today on 1956 Imperial automobile models. Philco began manufacturing the all-transistor car radio for Chrysler in the fall of 1955 at its Sandusky, Ohio plant.

With the new "Imperial" make, Chrysler Corporation's intention was to create an individual line of luxury cars, above and distinct from Chrysler branded vehicles. This marketing strategy suffered because the cars were rarely (if ever) sold in stand-alone Imperial showrooms. Cadillac and Lincoln did a much better job of separating their luxury marques from the lower priced cars that they sold. Imperial was instead offered at the Chrysler dealer network alongside Chrysler's offerings, and the marque was almost universally known as "Chrysler Imperial" in the public's mind for this reason, despite the fact that all existing dealerships did indeed carry separate "Imperial" dealership signs distinct from Chrysler.

The Imperial automobiles continued to be retailed through Chrysler dealerships. A distinct marketing channel was not established; thus, the Imperial nameplate failed to separate itself from the other Chrysler models and become a stand-alone marque. Beginning in 1967, the Imperial Division, offering three ranges (Custom, Crown, and LeBaron), retreated from their separate body-on-frame construction and their unique body on a 129.5-inch wheelbase. From that time, Imperials used the Chrysler body. It was fitted with unique styling, and through 1973, very long hoods which accounted for the three-inch-longer (127 vs. 124") wheelbase as compared to other Chrysler sedans. They continued to use their unique front suspension with torsion bars longer than all other Chrysler products and a rubber-isolated subframe crossmember containing the torsion bar anchors, as well as full instrumentation backed up by warning lights. In 1974 and 1975, separate brochures were published and separate Imperial signs still stood above the dealerships, and the Imperial continued to feature unique features (such as hidden headlights as featured since 1969, optional antilock brakes as offered since 1971, and standard four-wheel disc brakes in both 1974 and 1975), the wheelbase was reduced to the same 124" as other big Chryslers.

Although there were no Imperials produced between 1976 and 1978, the styling that was previously used for Imperial was rebranded as the Chrysler New Yorker Brougham during this time. The rear disc brakes and optional antilock feature disappeared, but the exceptionally nice interiors, including rear reading lights with precision-ground lenses which did not shine on the windshield, and four cigarette lighters, continued mostly unchanged.

1981–1983

The Imperial marque was again resurrected for the model years 1981 through 1983 with a Malaise era two-door coupe based on the second-generation Chrysler Cordoba platform with the designation Series YS. All examples of the 1981–1983 Imperial used Chrysler's 318 cubic-inch V8 engine.

1990–1993

1990 saw a revival of the Imperial as a high-end sedan in Chrysler's lineup to replace the dated Fifth Avenue. Unlike the 1955–1983 Imperial, this car was a model of Chrysler, not its own marque. Based on the Y platform, it represented the top full-size model in Chrysler's lineup; below it was the New Yorker Fifth Avenue, and below that was the shorter wheelbase New Yorker.

The reintroduction of the Imperial was two years after the Lincoln Continental was changed to a front-wheel drive sedan with a V6 engine. Other domestic competitors in this segment included the Cadillac Sedan de Ville/Fleetwood, Oldsmobile 98 and Buick Electra/Park Avenue, all of which shared General Motors' then-flagship C platform.

Though closely related, the Imperial differed from the New Yorker Fifth Avenue in many ways. The Imperial's nose was more wedge-shaped, while the New Yorker Fifth Avenue's initially had a sharper, more angular profile (the New Yorker Fifth Avenue was later restyled to be more rounded front and rear). The rears of the two cars also differed. Like the front, the New Yorker Fifth Avenue's rear came to stiffer angles while the Imperial's rear-end had more contoured edges. Also found on the Imperial were full-width taillights which were similar to those of the Chrysler TC, and reminiscent of the early 1980s Imperial coupe, while the New Yorker Fifth Avenue came with smaller vertical taillights. On the inside, the Imperial's "Kimberly Velvet" (Mark Cross Leather was available) seats carried a more streamlined look, while the New Yorker Fifth Avenue came with its signature pillowed cushion button-tufted seats.

For 1991, the 3.3 L V6 was replaced by the larger 3.8 L EGH V6. A four-speed automatic transmission was standard with both engines.

This generation Imperial was a 6-passenger sedan offered in either velour or Mark Cross leather. Power equipment came standard, as did automatic climate controlled air conditioning, anti-lock brakes, cruise control, driver's side airbag, and its distinct landau vinyl roof. The Imperial featured hidden headlamps behind retractable covers similar to those found on the LeBaron coupe/convertible and New Yorker/Fifth Avenue. The Imperial was available with a choice of several Infinity sound systems, all with a cassette player. Other major options included fully electronic digital instrument cluster with information center, electronically controlled air suspension system, and remote keyless entry with security alarm. Dealer-installed integrated Chrysler cellular phones and six-disc CD changers were also available.

All seventh generation Imperials were covered by Chrysler's market-leading "Crystal Key Owner Care Program" which included a 5-year/50,000-mile limited warranty and 7-year/70,000-mile powertrain warranty. A 24-hour toll-free customer service hotline was also provided.

As originally planned, this generation Chrysler Imperial was discontinued after the 1993 model year along with the Y-body and C-body New Yorkers.  They were replaced by the new LH platform sedans.  While the New Yorker name continued on for three more years, 1993 would be the last year for Imperial.  The critically acclaimed cab-forward styled Chrysler LHS replaced the Imperial as Chrysler's flagship model for 1994.

Production figures and prices

2006

A Chrysler Imperial concept car was presented at the 2006 North American International Auto Show. This concept used the Chrysler LY platform, an extended LX. It featured a  wheelbase. Riding on  wheels, the car presented "a six-figure image but at a much lower price" according to Tom Tremont, Vice President of advanced vehicle design for Chrysler. The design incorporated a long hood and front end dominated by an upright radiator and a horizontal themed grille. Brushed and polished aluminum pods evoked the free-standing headlamps (a classical throwback favored by 1960s Chrysler chief designers Virgil Exner and Elwood Engel, used commonly in 1930s Chrysler vehicles). Circular LED taillights with floating outer rings harkened to the "gun sight" taillight look of early 1960s Imperials. The roof line was pulled rearward to enlarge the cabin and to create a longer profile.

Cancellation
On 17 July 2007, Chrysler officially announced it would drop the production plans for the Imperial. Citing increasing fuel costs and more stringent fuel economy standards expected from Capitol Hill, Chrysler said that the Imperial project was off, as a viable business case could no longer be made for the car. The Imperial had been rumored to be based on the future Mercedes R-Class or the next generation LX-platform (LY, or a combination of components) and it is suggested that all of the work done on the Imperial program will be rolled into the forthcoming LY-platform cars. These cars will include the next generation Chrysler 300/300C, the long-wheelbase 300/300C (perhaps renamed "New Yorker") 

similar in size, but not necessarily in style, to the Imperial Concept car of 2006.

See also 
 Imperial (automobile)

References

External links

Online Imperial Club
Allpar – 1924–1930 Chrysler Imperials
Allpar – 1990–1993 Chrysler Imperials
TeamChicago.com – Imperial, By Chrysler
TeamChicago.com – Informative Imperial FAQ
Imperial Concept Designers' Story
Chrysler Imperial Concept

Imperial
Imperial
Full-size vehicles
Coupés
Sedans
Cars introduced in 1926
1930s cars
1940s cars
1950s cars
1990s cars
Front-wheel-drive vehicles
Rear-wheel-drive vehicles
24 Hours of Le Mans race cars
Limousines
Flagship vehicles
Luxury vehicles